G Scorpii (abbreviated G Sco), also named Fuyue, is a giant star in the constellation of Scorpius. It has an apparent magnitude of +3.19. It is approximately 126 light-years from the Sun.

Nomenclature 

G Scorpii is the star's Bayer designation. It was formerly situated in the constellation of Telescopium where it was designated γ Telescopii, Latinised to Gamma Telescopii. It was resited in Scorpius and redesignated G Scorpii by Benjamin Apthorp Gould.

In 2016, the IAU organized a Working Group on Star Names (WGSN) to catalog and standardize proper names for stars. The WGSN approved the name Fuyue for this star on 30 June 2017 and it is now so included in the List of IAU-approved Star Names.

G Scorpii bore the traditional name Fuyue (）in ancient China. Fu Yue was a former slave that became a high-ranking minister to Shang dynasty ruler Wu Ding.

Properties 

G Scorpii is an orange K-type giant. At the estimated distance of this system, this yields a physical size of about 16 times the radius of the Sun.

Evolutionary models show that G Scorpii has probably left the red giant branch and is now fusing helium in its core. This makes it a red clump star, at the cool end of the horizontal branch.

Just 5 arcminutes to the east is the globular cluster NGC 6441. At magnitude 3.2, G Scorpii is around 40 times brighter than the entire globular cluster.

References 

Scorpii, G
Durchmusterung objects
6630
161892
087261
K-type giants
Scorpius (constellation)